In mathematics, the universal enveloping algebra of a Lie algebra is the unital associative algebra whose representations correspond precisely to the representations of that Lie algebra.

Universal enveloping algebras are used in the representation theory of Lie groups and Lie algebras. For example, Verma modules can be constructed as quotients of the universal enveloping algebra. In addition, the enveloping algebra gives a precise definition for the Casimir operators. Because Casimir operators commute with all elements of a Lie algebra, they can be used to classify representations. The precise definition also allows the importation of Casimir operators into other areas of mathematics, specifically, those that have a differential algebra. They also play a central role in some recent developments in mathematics. In particular, their dual provides a commutative example of the objects studied in non-commutative geometry, the quantum groups. This dual can be shown, by the Gelfand–Naimark theorem, to contain the C* algebra of the corresponding Lie group. This relationship generalizes to the idea of Tannaka–Krein duality between compact topological groups and their representations.

From an analytic viewpoint, the universal enveloping algebra of the Lie algebra of a Lie group may be identified with the algebra of left-invariant differential operators on the group.

Informal construction

Generators and relations
Let  be a Lie algebra, assumed finite-dimensional for simplicity, with basis . Let  be the structure constants for this basis, so that

Then the universal enveloping algebra is the associative algebra (with identity) generated by elements  subject to the relations

and no other relations.

Consider, for example, the Lie algebra  sl(2,C), spanned by the matrices

The universal enveloping algebra of sl(2,C) is then the algebra generated by three elements  subject to the relations

and no other relations. We emphasize that the universal enveloping algebra is not the same as (or contained in) the algebra of  matrices. For example, the  matrix  satisfies , as is easily verified. But in the universal enveloping algebra, the element  does not satisfy —because we do not impose this relation in the construction of the enveloping algebra. Indeed, it follows from the  Poincaré–Birkhoff–Witt theorem (discussed below) that the elements  are all linearly independent in the universal enveloping algebra.

Finding a basis
In general, elements of the universal enveloping algebra are linear combinations of products of the generators in all possible orders. For example, whenever we have a term that contains  (in the "wrong" order), we can use the relations to rewrite this as  plus a linear combination of the 's. Doing this sort of thing repeatedly eventually converts any element into a linear combination of terms in ascending order. Thus, elements of the form

with the 's being non-negative integers, span the enveloping algebra. (We allow , meaning that we allow terms in which no factors of  occur.) The Poincaré–Birkhoff–Witt theorem, discussed below, asserts that these elements are linearly independent and thus form a basis for the universal enveloping algebra. In particular, the universal enveloping algebra is always infinite dimensional.

The Poincaré–Birkhoff–Witt theorem implies, in particular, that the elements  themselves are linearly independent. It is therefore common—if potentially confusing—to identify the 's with the generators  of the original Lie algebra. That is to say, we identify the original Lie algebra as the subspace of its universal enveloping algebra spanned by the generators. Although  may be an algebra of  matrices, the universal enveloping of  does not consists of (finite-dimensional) matrices.

Formalities
The formal construction of the universal enveloping algebra takes the above ideas, and wraps them in notation and terminology that makes it more convenient to work with. The most important difference is that the free associative algebra used in the above is narrowed to the tensor algebra, so that the product of symbols is understood to be the tensor product. The commutation relations are imposed by constructing a quotient space of the tensor algebra quotiented by the smallest two-sided ideal containing elements of the form .

Formal definition
Recall that every Lie algebra  is in particular a vector space. Thus, one is free to construct the tensor algebra  from it.

That is, one constructs the space

Here,  is the field over which the Lie algebra is defined. From here, through to the remainder of this article, the tensor product is always explicitly shown. Many authors omit it, since, with practice, its location can usually be inferred from context. Here, a very explicit approach is adopted, to minimize any possible confusion about the meanings of expressions.

The first step in the construction is to "lift" the Lie bracket from the Lie algebra (where it is defined) to the tensor algebra (where it is not), so that one can coherently work with the Lie bracket of two tensors. The lifting is done as follows.  First, recall that the bracket operation on a Lie algebra is a bilinear map  that is bilinear, skew-symmetric and satisfies the Jacobi identity. We wish to define a Lie bracket [-,-] that is a map  that is also bilinear, skew symmetric and obeys the Jacobi identity.

The lifting can be done grade by grade.

This is a consistent, coherent definition, because both sides are bilinear, and both sides are skew symmetric (the Jacobi identity will follow shortly).

and likewise

It is straightforward to verify that the above definition is bilinear, and is skew-symmetric; one can also show that it obeys the Jacobi identity.

The result of this lifting is explicitly a Poisson algebra. It is a unital associative algebra with a Lie bracket that is compatible with the Lie algebra bracket; it is compatible by construction. It is not the smallest such algebra, however; it contains far more elements than needed. One can get something smaller by projecting back down.

where the equivalence relation  is given by

That is, the Lie bracket defines the equivalence relation used to perform the quotienting. The result is still a unital associative algebra, and one can still take the Lie bracket of any two members. Computing the result is straight-forward, if one keeps in mind that each element of  can be understood as a coset: one just takes the bracket as usual, and searches for the coset that contains the result. It is the smallest such algebra; one cannot find anything smaller that still obeys the axioms of an associative algebra.

The universal enveloping algebra is what remains of the tensor algebra after modding out the Poisson algebra structure. (This is a non-trivial statement; the tensor algebra has a rather complicated structure: it is, among other things, a Hopf algebra; the Poisson algebra is likewise rather complicated, with many peculiar properties. It is compatible with the tensor algebra, and so the modding can be performed. The Hopf algebra structure is conserved; this is what leads to its many novel applications, e.g. in string theory. However, for the purposes of the formal definition, none of this particularly matters.)

The construction can be performed in a slightly different (but ultimately equivalent) way. Forget, for a moment, the above lifting, and instead consider the two-sided ideal  generated by elements of the form

This generator is an element of

A general member of the ideal  will have the form

Clearly,  is a subspace. It is an ideal, in that if  and  then  and  Establishing that this is an ideal is important, because ideals are precisely those things that one can quotient with; ideals lie in the kernel of the quotienting map. That is, one has the short exact sequence

where each arrow is a linear map, and the kernel of that map is given by the image of the previous map. The universal enveloping algebra can then be defined as

Superalgebras and other generalizations
The above construction focuses on Lie algebras and on the Lie bracket, and its skewness and antisymmetry. To some degree, these properties are incidental to the construction. Consider instead some (arbitrary) algebra (not a Lie algebra) over a vector space, that is, a vector space  endowed with multiplication  that takes elements   If the multiplication is bilinear, then the same construction and definitions can go through. One starts by lifting  up to  so that the lifted  obeys all of the same properties that the base  does – symmetry or antisymmetry or whatever. The lifting is done exactly as before, starting with

This is consistent precisely because the tensor product is bilinear, and the multiplication is bilinear. The rest of the lift is performed so as to preserve multiplication as a homomorphism. By definition, one writes

and also that

This extension is consistent by appeal to a lemma on free objects: since the tensor algebra is a free algebra, any homomorphism on its generating set can be extended to the entire algebra. Everything else proceeds as described above: upon completion, one has a unital associative algebra; one can take a quotient in either of the two ways described above.

The above is exactly how the universal enveloping algebra for Lie superalgebras is constructed. One need only to carefully keep track of the sign, when permuting elements. In this case, the (anti-)commutator of the superalgebra lifts to an (anti-)commuting Poisson bracket.

Another possibility is to use something other than the tensor algebra as the covering algebra. One such possibility is to use the exterior algebra; that is, to replace every occurrence of the tensor product by the exterior product.  If the base algebra is a Lie algebra, then the result is the Gerstenhaber algebra; it is the exterior algebra of the corresponding Lie group. As before, it has a grading naturally coming from the grading on the exterior algebra. (The Gerstenhaber algebra should not be confused with the Poisson superalgebra; both invoke anticommutation, but in different ways.)

The construction has also been generalized for Malcev algebras, Bol algebras and left alternative algebras.

Universal property
The universal enveloping algebra, or rather the universal enveloping algebra together with the canonical map  , possesses a universal property. Suppose we have any Lie algebra map

to a unital associative algebra  (with Lie bracket in  given by the commutator). More explicitly, this means that we assume

for all . Then there exists a unique unital algebra homomorphism

such that

where  is the canonical map. (The map  is obtained by embedding  into its tensor algebra and then composing with the quotient map to the universal enveloping algebra. This map is an embedding, by the Poincaré–Birkhoff–Witt theorem.)

.

(Take .) These operators (from the center of  ) act as scalars and provide important information about the representations. The quadratic Casimir element is of particular importance in this regard.

Other algebras
Although the canonical construction, given above, can be applied to other algebras, the result, in general, does not have the universal property. Thus, for example, when the construction is applied to Jordan algebras, the resulting enveloping algebra contains the special Jordan algebras, but not the exceptional ones: that is, it does not envelope the Albert algebras. Likewise, the Poincaré–Birkhoff–Witt theorem, below, constructs a basis for an enveloping algebra; it just won't be universal. Similar remarks hold for the Lie superalgebras.

Poincaré–Birkhoff–Witt theorem 

This can be done in either one of two different ways: either by reference to an explicit vector basis on the Lie algebra, or in a coordinate-free fashion.

Using basis elements
One way is to suppose that the Lie algebra can be given a totally ordered basis, that is, it is the free vector space of a totally ordered set. Let  be the injection into the tensor algebra; this is used to give the tensor algebra a basis as well.

That is,  has a basis

where , the ordering being that of total order on the set . The proof of the theorem involves noting that, if one starts with out-of-order basis elements, these can always be swapped by using the commutator (together with the structure constants). The hard part of the proof is establishing that the final result is unique and independent of the order in which the swaps were performed.

This basis should be easily recognized as the basis of a symmetric algebra. See, however, the section on the algebra of symbols, below, for a more precise statement of the nature of the isomorphism.

It is useful, perhaps, to split the process into two steps. In the first step, one constructs the free Lie algebra: this is what one gets, if one mods out by all commutators, without specifying what the values of the commutators are. The second step is to apply the specific commutation relations from  The first step is universal, and does not depend on the specific  It can also be precisely defined: the basis elements are given by Hall words, a special case of which are the Lyndon words; these are explicitly constructed to behave appropriately as commutators.

Coordinate-free
One can also state the theorem in a coordinate-free fashion, avoiding the use of total orders and basis elements. This is convenient when there are difficulties in defining the basis vectors, as there can be for infinite-dimensional Lie algebras. It also gives a more natural form that is more easily extended to other kinds of algebras.  This is accomplished by constructing a filtration  whose limit is the universal enveloping algebra 

First, a notation is needed for an ascending sequence of subspaces of the tensor algebra. Let

where

is the -times tensor product of  The  form a filtration:

More precisely, this is a filtered algebra, since the filtration preserves the algebraic properties of the subspaces. Note that the limit of this filtration is the tensor algebra 

Next, define the space

This is the space  modulo all of the subspaces  of strictly smaller filtration degree. Note that  is not at all the same as the leading term  of the filtration, as one might naively surmise. It is not constructed through a set subtraction mechanism associated with the filtration.

This is perhaps not immediately obvious: to get this result, one must repeatedly apply the commutation relations, and turn the crank. The essence of the Poincaré–Birkhoff–Witt theorem is that it is always possible to do this, and that the result is unique.

What is left are the elements that are not expressible as commutators.

In this way, one is lead immediately to the symmetric algebra.  This is the algebra where all commutators vanish. It can be defined as a filtration  of symmetric tensor products . Its limit is the symmetric algebra . It is constructed by appeal to the same notion of naturality as before. One starts with the same tensor algebra, and just uses a different ideal, the ideal that makes all elements commute:

Thus, one can view the Poincaré–Birkhoff–Witt theorem as stating that  is isomorphic to the symmetric algebra , both as a vector space and as a commutative algebra.

The  also form a filtered algebra; its limit is   This is the associated graded algebra of the filtration.

To emphasize this, the notation  is sometimes used for  serving to remind that it is the filtered algebra.

Other algebras
The theorem, applied to Jordan algebras, yields the exterior algebra, rather than the symmetric algebra. In essence, the construction zeros out the anti-commutators. The resulting algebra is an enveloping algebra, but is not universal. As mentioned above, it fails to envelop the exceptional Jordan algebras.

Left-invariant differential operators
Suppose  is a real Lie group with Lie algebra . Following the modern approach, we may identify  with the space of left-invariant vector fields (i.e., first-order left-invariant differential operators). We then identify the vector in the tangent space with the associated left-invariant vector field. Now, the commutator (as differential operators) of two left-invariant vector fields is again a vector field and again left-invariant. This definition agrees with any other standard definition of the bracket structure on the Lie algebra of a Lie group.

We may then consider left-invariant differential operators of arbitrary order. Every such operator  can be expressed (non-uniquely) as a linear combination of products of left-invariant vector fields. The collection of all left-invariant differential operators on  forms an algebra, denoted . It can be shown that  is isomorphic to the universal enveloping algebra .

In the case that  arises as the Lie algebra of a real Lie group, one can use left-invariant differential operators to give an analytic proof of the Poincaré–Birkhoff–Witt theorem.

Algebra of symbols
That is, what the PBW theorem obscures (the commutation relations) the algebra of symbols restores into the spotlight.

The inverse map is

The algebraic structure is obtained by requiring that the product  act as an isomorphism, that is, so that

for polynomials 

An explicit expression for this product can be given: this is the Berezin formula. It follows essentially from the Baker–Campbell–Hausdorff formula for the product of two elements of a Lie group.

A closed form expression is given by

where

The universal enveloping algebra of the Heisenberg algebra is the Weyl algebra (modulo the relation that the center be the unit); here, the  product is called the Moyal product.

Representation theory

The representation theory of semisimple Lie algebras rests on the observation that there is an isomorphism, known as the Kronecker product:

for Lie algebras . The isomorphism follows from a lifting of the embedding

where

is just the canonical embedding (with subscripts, respectively for algebras one and two). It is straightforward to verify that this embedding lifts, given the prescription above. See, however, the discussion of the bialgebra structure in the article on tensor algebras for a review of some of the finer points of doing so: in particular, the shuffle product employed there corresponds to the Wigner-Racah coefficients, i.e. the 6j and 9j-symbols, etc.

Also important is that the universal enveloping algebra of a free Lie algebra is isomorphic to the free associative algebra.

Construction of representations typically proceeds by building the Verma modules of the highest weights.

In a typical context where  is acting by infinitesimal transformations, the elements of  act like differential operators, of all orders. (See, for example, the realization of the universal enveloping algebra as left-invariant differential operators on the associated group, as discussed above.)

Casimir operators

For a finite-dimensional semisimple Lie algebra, the Casimir operators form a distinguished basis from the center . These may be constructed as follows.

The center  corresponds to linear combinations of all elements  that commute with all elements  that is, for which  That is, they are in the kernel of  Thus, a technique is needed for computing that kernel.

By definition,  is a derivation on  if it obeys Leibniz's law:

(When  is the space of left invariant vector fields on a group , the Lie bracket is that of vector fields.) The lifting is performed by defining

From the PBW theorem, it is clear that all central elements are linear combinations of symmetric homogenous polynomials in the basis elements  of the Lie algebra. The Casimir invariants are the irreducible homogenous polynomials of a given, fixed degree. That is, given a basis , a Casimir operator of order  has the form

That is,  can be (should be) thought of as an element of  Recall that the adjoint representation is given directly by the structure constants, and so an explicit indexed form of the above equations can be given, in terms of the Lie algebra basis; this is originally a theorem of Israel Gel'fand.

where the structure constants are

As an example, the quadratic Casimir operator is

where  is the inverse matrix of the Killing form   That the Casimir operator  belongs to the center  follows from the fact that the Killing form is invariant under the adjoint action.

The center of the universal enveloping algebra of a simple Lie algebra is given in detail by the Harish-Chandra isomorphism.

Rank
The number of algebraically independent Casimir operators of a finite-dimensional semisimple Lie algebra is equal to the rank of that algebra, i.e. is equal to the rank of the Cartan–Weyl basis. This may be seen as follows.

For a -dimensional Lie algebra, that is, an algebra whose adjoint representation is -dimensional, the linear operator

implies that  is a -dimensional endomorphism, and so one has the characteristic equation

for elements   The non-zero roots of this characteristic polynomial (that are roots for all ) form the root system of the algebra. In general, there are only  such roots; this is the rank of the algebra.

The  are homogeneous polynomials of degree   This can be seen in several ways: Given a constant , ad is linear, so that  By plugging and chugging in the above, one obtains that

By linearity, if one expands in the basis,

then the polynomial has the form

By linearity and the commutativity of addition, i.e. that , one concludes that this tensor must be completely symmetric. This tensor is exactly the Casimir invariant of order 

One concludes that the roots form a space of rank  and that the Casimir invariants span this space. That is, the Casimir invariants generate the center

Example: Rotation group SO(3)
The rotation group SO(3) is of rank one, and thus has one Casimir operator. It is three-dimensional, and thus the Casimir operator must have order (3 − 1) = 2 i.e. be quadratic. Of course, this is the Lie algebra of  As an elementary exercise, one can compute this directly.

That is,

and explicit computation shows that

after making use of the structure constants

Example: Pseudo-differential operators
Thus, one is led to a ring of pseudo-differential operators, from which one can construct Casimir invariants.

If the Lie algebra  acts on a space of linear operators, such as in Fredholm theory, then one can construct Casimir invariants on the corresponding space of operators. The quadratic Casimir operator corresponds to an elliptic operator.

If the Lie algebra acts on a differentiable manifold, then each Casimir operator corresponds to a higher-order differential on the cotangent manifold, the second-order differential being the most common and most important.

If the action of the algebra is isometric, as would be the case for Riemannian or pseudo-Riemannian manifolds endowed with a metric and the symmetry groups SO(N) and SO (P, Q), respectively, one can then contract upper and lower indices (with the metric tensor) to obtain more interesting structures. For the quadratic Casimir invariant, this is the Laplacian. Quartic Casimir operators allow one to square the stress–energy tensor, giving rise to the Yang-Mills action. The Coleman–Mandula theorem restricts the form that these can take, when one considers ordinary Lie algebras. However, the Lie superalgebras are able to evade the premises of the Coleman–Mandula theorem, and can be used to mix together space and internal symmetries.

Examples in particular cases
If , then it has a basis of matriceswhich satisfy the following identities under the standard bracket:, and this shows us that the universal enveloping algebra has the presentationas a non-commutative ring.

To relate the above two cases: if  is a vector space  as abelian Lie algebra, the left-invariant differential operators are the constant coefficient operators, which are indeed a polynomial algebra in the partial derivatives of first order.

The center  consists of the left- and right- invariant differential operators; this, in the case of  not commutative, is often not generated by first-order operators (see for example Casimir operator of a semi-simple Lie algebra).

The algebra of differential operators in  variables with polynomial coefficients may be obtained starting with the Lie algebra of the Heisenberg group. See Weyl algebra for this; one must take a quotient, so that the central elements of the Lie algebra act as prescribed scalars.

The universal enveloping algebra of a finite-dimensional Lie algebra is a filtered quadratic algebra.

Hopf algebras and quantum groups 
The construction of the group algebra for a given group is in many ways analogous to constructing the universal enveloping algebra for a given Lie algebra. Both constructions are universal and translate representation theory into module theory. Furthermore, both group algebras and universal enveloping algebras carry natural comultiplications that turn them into Hopf algebras. This is made precise in the article on the tensor algebra: the tensor algebra has a Hopf algebra structure on it, and because the Lie bracket is consistent with (obeys the consistency conditions for) that Hopf structure, it is inherited by the universal enveloping algebra.

This algebra has a natural Hopf algebra structure: given two functions
, one defines multiplication as

and comultiplication as

the counit as

and the antipode as

Now, the Gelfand–Naimark theorem essentially states that every commutative Hopf algebra is isomorphic to the Hopf algebra of continuous functions on some compact topological group —the theory of compact topological groups and the theory of commutative Hopf algebras are the same.

These ideas can then be extended to the non-commutative case. One starts by defining the quasi-triangular Hopf algebras, and then performing what is called a quantum deformation to obtain the quantum universal enveloping algebra, or quantum group, for short.

See also
Milnor–Moore theorem
Harish-Chandra homomorphism

References

 

 
 Shlomo Sternberg (2004), Lie algebras, Harvard University.
 

Ring theory
Hopf algebras
Representation theory of Lie algebras